Bridgegate may refer to:

 Bridgegate, Chester, part of the city walls of Chester, U.K.
 The Fort Lee lane closure scandal under New Jersey Governor Chris Christie's administration

See also 

 Drawbridge, a type of bridge stereotypically employed as a gate
 Gate bridge (disambiguation)
 Toll bridge, a type of bridge typically having toll gates